Minuscule 4 (in the Gregory-Aland numbering of New Testament manuscripts), ε 371 (in von Soden's numbering of New Testament manuscripts), is a Greek minuscule manuscript of the New Testament, written on vellum. Using the study of comparative writing styles (palaeography), it has been dated to the 13th century. It was formerly named Codex Regius 84.
It has a full collection of marginal marks (known as marginalia). It was adapted for liturgical use.

Description 

The manuscript is a codex (precursor to the modern book), containing an almost complete text of the four Gospels with four gaps (Matthew 2:9-20; Mark 15:42-16:14; John 1:1-13.49-3:11), consisting of 212 parchment leaves (sized ). The text is written in one column per page, 26-28 lines per page.

The text is divided according to the chapters (known as κεφαλαια / kephalaia), whose numbers are given in the margin, with the titles of chapters (τιτλοι / titloi) at the top of the pages. There is also another division according to the smaller Ammonian Sections (an early division of the Gospels into sections). The codex has 27 sections in Mark. There are also references to the Eusebian Canons (another early division of the Gospels into sections, and where they overlap).

The Pericope Adulterae is marked with an obelus.

Text 

The Greek text of this codex is a mixture of text-types. According to biblical scholar Constantin von Tischendorf, its text is mixed but with a strong Byzantine element.

Biblical scholar Kurt Aland did not place it in any Category within his categories of New Testament manuscripts. Textually it is close to the codex 273.

According to the Claremont Profile Method (a specific analysis method of textual data), it represents K in Luke 10 and Luke 20. In Luke 1 it has mixed Byzantine text.

In  it has the textual variant ὁ δεύτερος (the second) instead of ὁ πρῶτος (the first),  ὁ ὕστερος (the last), or ὁ ἔσχατος (the last). This reading is supported by Minuscule 273 and lectionary ℓ 547.

History 

The manuscript was used by biblical scholar Desiderius Erasmus in his edition of Novum Testamentum, and by Robert Estienne in his Editio Regia (1550), who designated it as γ'. Biblical scholar John Mill noticed its affinity to the Latin versions and the Complutensian Polyglot.

It was examined by Scholz and Paulin Martin. Biblical scholar Caspar René Gregory saw the manuscript in 1885.

The codex is located now at the Bibliothèque nationale de France (Gr. 84) in Paris.

See also 

 List of New Testament minuscules
 Textus Receptus
 Textual criticism

References

Further reading 

 Jean-Pierre-Paul Martin, Description technique des manuscrits grecs, relatif au Nouveau Testament, conservé dans les bibliothèques des Paris (Paris 1883), p. 18-19

External links 

 R. Waltz, Minuscule 4 at the Encyclopedia of Textual Criticism (2007)
 
 Online images of Minuscule 4 at the National Library of France.
 Online images of Minuscule 4 (microfilm) at the CSNTM.

Greek New Testament minuscules
13th-century biblical manuscripts
Bibliothèque nationale de France collections